Ripple Effect is a 2007 American drama film written and directed by Philippe Caland and starring Forest Whitaker, Virginia Madsen, Minnie Driver and Caland.  Whitaker, Madsen and Driver also served as executive producers of the film.

Cast
Forest Whitaker as Phillip
Virginia Madsen as Sherry
Minnie Driver as Kitty
Philippe Caland as Amer
John Billingsley
Kip Pardue
Kali Rocha
Charley Mae Caland

Reception
The film has a 29% rating on Rotten Tomatoes.

References

External links
 
 

American drama films
2007 drama films
2007 films
Films scored by Anthony Marinelli
2000s English-language films
2000s American films